Gunnaur  Assembly constituency is  one of the 403 constituencies of the Uttar Pradesh Legislative Assembly,  India. It is a part of the Budaun district and one  of the five assembly constituencies in the Badaun Lok Sabha constituency. First election in this assembly constituency was held in 1952 after the "DPACO (1951)" (delimitation order) was passed in 1951. After the "Delimitation of Parliamentary and Assembly Constituencies Order" was passed in 2008, the constituency was assigned identification number 111.

Wards  / Areas
Extent  of Gunnaur Assembly constituency is Gunnaur Tehsil.

Members of Legislative Assembly

Election results

2022

2012

2007

2004

See also 

Sambhal district
Budaun Lok Sabha constituency
Sixteenth Legislative Assembly of Uttar Pradesh
Uttar Pradesh Legislative Assembly
Vidhan Bhawan

References

External links
 

|}

Assembly constituencies of Uttar Pradesh
Politics of Budaun district
Constituencies established in 1951